Brick Chapel United Methodist Church, also known as Montgomery Chapel, is a historic Methodist church located in Monroe Township, Putnam County, Indiana. The church was built in 1872, and extensively remodeled in 1912 in the Renaissance Revival style. A Sunday School addition was built in 1956. It features a large stained glass window, recessed arches, and an entrance tower.  Also on the property is the contributing church cemetery established in 1839, with over 2,000 burials.

It was listed on the National Register of Historic Places in 2003.

References

Methodist churches in Indiana
Churches on the National Register of Historic Places in Indiana
Renaissance Revival architecture in Indiana
Churches completed in 1872
1839 establishments in Indiana
Buildings and structures in Putnam County, Indiana
National Register of Historic Places in Putnam County, Indiana